"Why?" is the debut single by British girl group Mis-Teeq. It was written by Alan Glass, David Brant, Ronald St. Louis, and Maryann Morgan and produced by Brant for Vybrant Music. Originally a midtempo R&B track, it was remixed into an uptempo UK garage remix by Matt "Jam" Lamont and DJ Face. Released as a single in January 2001, it reached number eight on the UK Singles Chart. "Why?" is the only single to feature original member Zena McNally, who left the group to pursue a solo career soon after the single was released.

Track listings

Notes
  denotes additional producer

Personnel and credits 
Credits adapted from the liner notes of Lickin' on Both Sides.

 David Brant – producer, writer
 Alesha Dixon – vocals
 DJ Face – remix
 Alan Glass – writer
 Matt "Jam" Lamont – remix

 Zena McNally – vocals
 Maryanne Morgan – writer
 Su-Elise Nash – vocals
 Ronald St. Louis – writer
 Sabrina Washington – vocals

Charts

Weekly charts

Year-end charts

Release history

References

2000 songs
2001 debut singles
Mis-Teeq songs
Songs written by Alesha Dixon
Songs written by Sabrina Washington
Telstar Records singles
UK garage songs